Jessica Madison Wright Morris (July 29, 1984 – July 21, 2006), known professionally as J. Madison Wright, was an American actress.  Born in Cincinnati, she spent her early years being raised in Lexington, Kentucky. She was best known for her role as Sam Wallace in Shiloh. She co-starred in Shiloh with her younger sister Tori Wright.

Biography

Early life
Madison Wright was born to parents Scott and Melissa. In addition to Victoria ‘Tori’ she had two younger brothers, Isaiah and Elijah. Madison's showbiz career started when she was five years old, as a child model, and she won a summer contract to model in New York. There she experienced her first taste of acting in television commercials. The Wright family relocated to Los Angeles in order to pursue Madison's blooming acting career. In 1994, at the age of nine, she made her acting debut in the comedy Grace Under Fire.

Career
A few months later, her big break came when she was cast in the role of ten-year-old True Danziger in the science fiction television series Earth 2 by producers Cleve Landsberg, Chip Masamitsu, Janace Tashjian and Tony To. The show lasted only one season, airing between 1994 and 1995.

Madison moved onto other projects, including portraying a sick child in an Emmy-nominated episode of ER, where she played the first child character to die in the show's history.

Her other roles included the family film Shiloh alongside her little sister Tori Wright, the science fiction film The Warlord: Battle for the Galaxy, The Burning Zone and the 1998 Disney film Safety Patrol. Wright was retired from acting by 1999, then her family moved back to Kentucky.

Health problems and death
After repeated bouts of pneumonia and general ill-health, Madison was diagnosed with restrictive cardiomyopathy, a condition that required her to receive a heart transplant. After a short wait on the donor waiting list, the then fifteen-year-old Madison received the transplant at the Cleveland Clinic in March 2000. Clancy Brown, the actor who played the father of Madison's character in Earth 2, led an appeal to raise money to cover the Wrights' medical costs.

After a quick recovery, and between concentrating on her school work and enjoying cheerleading in her extracurricular time, Madison gave talks to various groups on the importance of organ donation. After finishing at South Laurel High School, she attended the University of the Cumberlands in Williamsburg, where she studied English and worked to obtain her teaching credentials.

On July 8, 2006, J. Madison Wright married Brent Joseph Morris, a University of Kentucky medical student. A day after she returned from her honeymoon in Hawaii, Madison suffered a heart attack and was admitted to the University of Kentucky Medical Center where she died on July 21, 2006, two weeks after her wedding, and eight days before her 22nd birthday. Her funeral was held at Corinth Baptist Church in London, Kentucky, the same church in which she was married, and she was buried at A. R. Dyche Memorial Park. Prior to her death J. Madison Wright was planning to teach English at George Rogers Clark High School.

Filmography

References

External links

1984 births
2006 deaths
20th-century American actresses
Actresses from Cincinnati
Actresses from Kentucky
American child actresses
American film actresses
American television actresses
Burials in Kentucky
Heart transplant recipients
People from Lexington, Kentucky
University of the Cumberlands alumni
21st-century American women